Mazandarani culture includes existing social characteristics and norms as well as beliefs, arts, laws, customs and traditions that are common among the Mazandarani people.

See also 
 Tabaristan
 Mazandarani language
 Tabarian calendar

References 

Mazandarani_culture
Tabaristan